Arrout is a commune in the Ariège department in the Occitanie region of south-western France.

The inhabitants of the commune are known as Arrotois or Arrotoises

Geography

Arrout is a commune in the Pyrenees mountains in the former province of Couserans some 12 km south-west of Saint-Girons and 3 km north of Castillon-en-Couserans. Access to the commune is by a country road from the end of the D404, which comes from Cescau in the south-east, to the village or by the Chemin d'Arrout from Audressein in the south. There is also a country road from Alas in the north-east. The commune is rugged and heavily forested throughout.

The Lez river forms the south-eastern border of the commune as it flows north-east to join the Salat at Saint-Girons. The Cayssau stream rises in the north-west and forms the north-western border before joining the Ruisseau de Lachein. The Ruisseau de Lasquert rises in the centre of the commune and flows north-east to join the Ruisseau de Lachein which flows south-west to join the Lez.

Neighbouring communes and villages

Heraldry

Administration

List of Successive Mayors

Demography
In 2017 the commune had 85 inhabitants.

Culture and Heritage
Arrout is one of the communes who received the Green Star of Esperanto from Esperanto info, an award given to mayors of communes who take a census of Esperanto speakers.

Religious Heritage

The Church contains three items that are registered as historical objects:
A Chalice with Paten (17th century)
A Ciborium (17th century)
A Templar door (12th century)

See also
Communes of the Ariège department

References

External links
Arrout on the National Geographic Institute website 
Arrout official website 
Arrout on Géoportail, National Geographic Institute (IGN) website 
Arrout on the 1750 Cassini Map

Communes of Ariège (department)